Sunil Khan (born 28 August 1947) is an Indian politician for the Durgapur in West Bengal.

External links
 Official biographical sketch in Parliament of India website

1947 births
Living people
Communist Party of India (Marxist) politicians from West Bengal
India MPs 2004–2009
People from Bankura district
Lok Sabha members from West Bengal
India MPs 1996–1997
India MPs 1998–1999
India MPs 1999–2004
People from Paschim Bardhaman district